EverythingCU.com is reportedly an online community of credit union professionals, but is currently serving as host for online gaming. When it began in 2000, it was known as CUMarketingDept.com, and was specifically targeted to credit union marketing professionals. In 2004, the name changed to EverythingCU.com. As of November 2007, EverythingCU.com hosted 5,620 members. Online conversations cover a wide range of topics of concern to credit unions. The site used to facilitates document exchange among its members.

The site used to host educational webinars, and an annual educational and networking event for credit union professionals.

Whois Registry data shows the last Updated Date as 2022-11-04T07:49:07Z, and the About page currently states: "he [sic] website gives you the opportunity to play free online casino games. On the site you will find gambling games from over 100 casino software developers.  Read More"

See also
:Category:Credit unions

References

External links
EverythingCU.com
Press release from the World Council of Credit Unions about brand consulting given to the Bahamas Cooperative League.

Community websites